"" is a song by German band Juli. It was written by Simon Triebel and produced by O.L.A.F. Opal for their second studio album Ein neuer Tag (2006).

Charts

References

2007 singles
2006 songs
Juli (band) songs
Songs written by Simon Triebel
German-language songs